İsmail Hakkı Bursevî (Turkish: Bursalı İsmail Hakkı, Persian: Esmā’īl Ḥaqqī Borsavī) was a 17th-century Ottoman Turkish Muslim scholar, a Jelveti Sufi author on mystical experience and the esoteric interpretation of the Quran; also a poet and musical composer.  İsmail Hakkı Bursevî influenced many parts the Ottoman Empire but primarily Turkey. To this day he is revered as one of the Büyükler, the great saints of Anatolia.

He is regarded as an eminent literary figure in the Turkish language, having authored more than a hundred works. Translations of some of his works are now available for the English-speaking world.

Life

İsmail Hakkı was the son of Muṣṭafā, who was in turn son of Bayram Čawush, who was in turn son of Shah Ḵhudā-bende. İsmail Hakkı was born in 1652 or 1653 in Aytos, Thrace, although his parents came from Aksaray, Istanbul. His mother died when he was aged seven and on the suggestion of Shaykh Osman Fazli around 1663 he was sent to Edirne (Adrinaople), to receive a traditional education under the scholar ʿAbd-al-Baki, a relative of the Shaykh.

In 1673, aged 21, he went to Istanbul to the public classes of Osman Fazli, the head Sheykh of the Jelveti (Djilwatiyya) order, who initiated him into that discipline. İsmail Hakkı also attended the lectures of other scholars, and learnt Persian to study Attar, Rumi, Ḥāfiẓ and Jami. He also studied Islamic calligraphy and music and set to music many hymns of the 17th century mystic Hudāyī, founder of the Jelveti order.

In 1675, age 23, Osman Fazli sent him, with three assistant dervishes, to Skopje (Üsküb), Macedonia, to establish a ṭarīqah (a monastery) for teaching Jelveti philosophy. Some welcomed them and İsmail Hakkı married the daughter of Sheikh Muṣṭafā ʿUshshāḳī. Encouraged by his master's letters he wrote his most brilliant sermons. However he offended the townsfolk by overly-berating them for what he considered loose behaviour. Despite Osman Fazli explaining to him that censure was not the Jelveti way he did not rein in his zeal and his antagonists forced them to leave, which greatly displeased his wife, it being her home town.

In 1682 he was invited to Strumica, Macedonia to teach public classes. There he also began to write books, but so as to not be confused with the author Ismail Hakki Ankaravi, a famous commentator on the Mathnavi, he came to be always given a suffix, such as Hâlvetî, Bursevi, or Üsküdari

Amongst Sufis, Bursa in Anatolia was first made famous by the 14th century Shāikhs Somuncu Baba and Haji Bayram, but in 1685 the then Sheykh of Bursa died and Fasli appointed Ismail Hakki as the new Sheykh. Unfortunately his first years in Bursa coincided with the difficult period after the Ottoman Empire's disastrous loss at the Battle of Vienna and the Holy League's invasion of the Ottoman Balkans, so Ismāʿīl Ḥaḳḳī became very poor and had to sell his books to survive.

In 1690 he journeyed to Cyprus to visit his master, Osman Farsli, who was in exile for his insistent criticism of Ottoman foreign policy. On his death Ismail Hakki succeeded him as the head of the order.

In 1695–1697 Sultan Mustafa II requested Ismail Hakki accompany his military campaigns against the Habsburg Empire and he was in several battles until he was severely wounded. Osman Farsli had foreseen the end of the Ottoman line and Bursevi defined the reason for its decline as the estrangement of spiritual and political powers, represented in his discourses by a Sheikh and a Sultan, thus formulating a Sufi interpretation of the Ottoman decline paradigm.

In 1700 Ismail Hakki performed the Hajj, the pilgrimage, but on returning from Mecca the caravan's members were slaughtered by Bedouin brigands. Ismail was left to die but managed to reach Damascus.

In 1700 he returned to Bursa. In 1717 he moved to Damascus and wrote 12 more books. In 1720 he returned to Üsküdar, the Anatolian part of Istanbul, where he began teaching again. However he was twice attacked by fanatical mobs and decided to return to Bursa.

In 1722, at Bursa he bequeathed his books to public libraries, left all his money for the construction of a small mosque, and entered into a retreat. That mosque is now within the Ismail Hakki Kur’an Kursu.

In July 1724 or 1725 he died in serenity. His tomb is at the rear of the mosque.

Major works
İsmail Hakkı was one of the most prolific Ottoman scholars, with 106 books and pamphlets: 46 in Arabic and 60 in Turkish. To this day he is revered as an eminent literary figure in the Turkish language. He wrote on Islamic sciences, Sufism, Tasawuf, Islamic philosophy, morality and tafsir in a manner which avoided the flowery style of many contemporaries, resembling the style of Yunus Emre.

His most famous published works are: 
 Rūḥ al-bayān ("The Spirit of Elucidation"), a voluminous esoteric interpretation of the Quran, combining the ideas of the author, Ibn Arabi and Al-Ghazali, and written in a Persian poetic form. (4637 pages, 4 vols. Boulaq, 1859)
 Rūḥ al-Mathnawī, a commentary on verses of the Masnavi (Istanbul, 1870–1872)
 A commentary on the Fusus al-Hikam by ibn ʻArabi, translated into English (Oxford, 1985–1991)
 Lübb’ül-Lüb (Kernel of the Kernel), translated into English (Cheltenham, 1980)
 Šarḥ-e pand-nāma-ye ʿAṭṭār, a translation of ʿAṭṭār’s Pand-nāma (Istanbul, 1772)
 Šarḥ-e Būstān; and a dīvān in Turkish (Cairo, 1841)
 Commentary on Najm al-Din Kubra's al-Uṣūl al-ʿašara (Istanbul, 1874)

Teachings

As a Sufi of Jelveti order, Ismail Hakki Bursevi put all his energy and resilience into being a ‘bearer of light’. The plaque on his tomb says:

Footnote
Although Yahya Michot controversially claims that "Ahmad's Sharia" on the plaque on the tomb refers to the Anatolian reformer Ahmad al-Rumi al-Aqhisari (d. 1632) who, confident in the ability of the sharia to bring about a just order, called "for its implementation as a way to curb the despotism and injustice of sultans and qadis. A barrier against tyranny..." the term refers to the divine law of Prophet Muhammad, also referred to as Ahmad in the Quran and in some Muslim literature, as agreed upon by the majority of Islamic scholars.

See also 
 Ibn 'Arabi
 Mahmud Hudayi
 Muhammed Hamdi Yazır
 Ebussuud Efendi
 Halveti
 Niyazi al-Misri
 List of composers of classical Turkish music

References

External links 
 TDV İslâm Ansiklopedisi (Turkish academic encyclopedia for Islamic studies), (in Turkish) İsmâil Hakkı Bursevî (images) or İsmâil Hakkı Bursevî (text), accessdate 19 November 2016
 Namli, Ali, Dr. (in Turkish) İsmâil Hakkı Bursevî’nin Hüdâyî’ye Bakışı Ve Hüdâyî’nin Bursevî’ye Tesirleri (Bursevî's views on Mahmud Hudayi and Huday's effect on Bursevi.) May download as pdf, accessdate 19 November 2016
 Brockelmann, Carl. (in German) Geschichte der Arabischen Litteratur, Kapitel Rūmtürken und Osmanen, 6 Die Mystik (History of Arabic Literature; chapter Turkish and Ottoman, section Mystics) Volume II, (1806) and Supplement II (1909) Brill Academic Publishers. Viewing fee, accessdate 7 November 2016
 Library of Congress İsmail Hakkı, Bursalı, 1653–1724 or 1725 access date 15 December 2016

Hanafis
Maturidis
Quranic exegesis scholars
Composers of Ottoman classical music
Composers of Turkish makam music
Sunni Sufis
Ottoman Sufis
Turkish Sufis
1653 births
1725 deaths
17th-century Muslim scholars of Islam